The Sony FE PZ 28-135mm F4 G OSS is a full-frame constant maximum aperture advanced standard zoom lens for the Sony E-mount, announced by Sony on September 12, 2014.

Though designed for Sony's full frame E-mount cameras, the lens can be used on Sony's APS-C E-mount camera bodies, with an equivalent full-frame field-of-view of 42-202.5mm.

See also
List of Sony E-mount lenses

References

Camera lenses introduced in 2014
28-135